Angela Hannah (born 24 March 1986 in Harare, Zimbabwe) is a British sprint canoer who has competed since 2007. In the 2012 European Championships she finished 4th in the K4 500m event. She is part of the women's K4 500 m Great Britain team for the 2012 Olympics.

References

External links
 
 
 
 

1986 births
Sportspeople from Harare
Living people
Canoeists at the 2012 Summer Olympics
Olympic canoeists of Great Britain
British female canoeists
Canoeists at the 2016 Summer Olympics
Zimbabwean emigrants to the United Kingdom
ICF Canoe Sprint World Championships medalists in kayak
Canoeists at the 2015 European Games
European Games competitors for Great Britain